The ITU indoor propagation model, also known as ITU model for indoor attenuation, is a radio propagation model that estimates the path loss inside a room or a closed area inside a building delimited by walls of any form. Suitable for appliances designed for indoor use, this model approximates the total path loss an indoor link may experience.

Applicable to/under conditions

This model is applicable to only the indoor environments. Typically, such appliances use the lower microwave bands around 2.4 GHz. However, the model applies to a much wider range.

Coverage

Frequency: 900 MHz to 5.2 GHz

Floors: 1 to 3

Mathematical formulations

The model

The ITU indoor path loss model is formally expressed as:

where,
L = the total path loss. Unit: decibel (dB).
f = Frequency of transmission. Unit: megahertz(MHz).
d = Distance. Unit: meter (m).
N = The distance power loss coefficient.
n = Number of floors between the transmitter and receiver.
Pf(n) = the floor loss penetration factor.

Calculation of distance power loss coefficient

The distance power loss coefficient, N is the quantity that expresses the loss of signal power with distance. This coefficient is an empirical one. Some values are provided in Table 1.

Calculation of floor penetration loss factor

The floor penetration loss factor is an empirical constant dependent on the number of floors the waves need to penetrate. Some values are tabulated in Table 2.

See also

Log-distance path loss model
Radio propagation model
Young model

References

Further reading

 Introduction to RF propagation, John S. Seybold, 2000, John Wiley and Sons.
 Propagation data and prediction methods for the planning of indoor radio communication systems and the radio local area networks in the frequency range 900 MHz to 100 GHz, ITU-R Recommendations, Geneva, 2001.
 Propagation data and prediction methods for the planning of indoor radiocommunication systems and radio local area networks in the requency range 900 MHz to 100 GHz, Recommendation ITU-R P.1238-7, Geneva, 2012

Radio frequency propagation model